Roger W. Tracy, Jr. (September 27, 1938 – September 27, 2007) was a member of the Ohio House of Representatives.

References

Dean Supply Co. v. Roger Tracy
Ticketmaster v. Tracy
Hasan v. Tracy

Republican Party members of the Ohio House of Representatives
1938 births
2007 deaths
20th-century American politicians